Alexander de Cadenet (born 24 May 1974), also known as Bruiser, is a British artist working in various media: predominantly painting, photography and sculpture. He is most known for his photographic "skull portraits" and also his meteorite and Life Burger sculptures. Set within the tradition of Vanitas, these works are designed as aids to spiritual and philosophical contemplation. He has referred to his art work as "a way to give experience meaning in a tangible form; it is an exploration into the mysteries and sacredness of life and its presentation through art".

Life
De Cadenet was born and brought up in Chelsea, London and continues to live and work both in the UK and in Los Angeles, USA. He was educated at Ashfold Prep School and Harrow School, where he won the Lincoln-Seligmann Art Prize in 1992. In 1995, he curated Liberty a show of art by prisoners and special hospital patients, selected from the Koestler Awards Scheme, with the support of Chief Inspectorate of Prisons, Sir Stephen Tumim. In 1996 he graduated with a B.A. from the Courtauld Institute of Art. Between 1997 – 2000, De Cadenet was the Arts Editor for Sleazenation magazine, a fashion and lifestyle magazine, featuring interviews with YBA artists including; Marc Quinn, Gavin Turk, Gilbert & George and Steven Willats.

Since 2016, de Cadenet has been the contributing Arts Editor of Watkins Mind Body Spirit Magazine. His interviews include Eckhart Tolle, about the relationship of art and enlightenment, David Lynch, on transcendental meditation, Alex Grey & Alison Grey, on visionary art.

Career

Skull portraits

De Cadenet launched his "skull portrait" concept at The Mark, a warehouse space gallery the artist opened at 259 Kings Road London in 1996. It featured an x-ray of his own skull hanging from the ceiling. Between 1996 and 2016, de Cadenet presented a successive series of photographic "skull portraits", based on X-rays of his subjects' skulls.

In 1998 he presented Skullduggery, featuring skull portraits of fashion models on the exterior of the Victoria & Albert Museum.

In 1999 he presented the complete Celebrity Series at an isolated location outside the Masai Mara in Kenya with the assistance of Cottars Safari. The show was attended by thousands of Masai tribe and some art collectors who flew to Kenya for the opening night.

In 2003 he presented a solo show (British Spies) in both the university and museum buildings of the Courtauld Institute of Art in Somerset house on the Strand, London.
The ongoing series of works explores the themes of human achievement and the sacredness of art in particular within the tradition of Vanitas.The ten feet high cibachrome photographic Celebrity Series was first presented in the UK in 2000 at 30 Underwood Street Gallery in Shoreditch, London.

The artist has been sourcing the skull x-rays of significant subjects from history who are no longer living for incorporation into  skull portraits. As of 2015, he has made portraits of Pharaoh Tutankhamun, Adolf Hitler, Albert Einstein and Marilyn Monroe. In 2016, the artist presented a skull portrait of Richard III in conjunction with Leicester University.

In October 2022 de Cadenet presented within the Saatchi Gallery London with West Contemporary a new series of skull portraits, based on photos taken in 1947 of the remains of the Medici Family within the Michelangelo designed tomb. This series was the first skull portraits series the artist had created for seven years and revealed various stylistic innovations, including the use of photos as opposed to x-ray photography, printing on aluminium, incorporating hand painted (and some with glitter) quotes spoken by the subjects or from Machiavelli texts that reference the subjects’ characters and introducing different coloured auras for the subjects. This series specifically explores the facility of art to question the nature of identity and to contribute to the ongoing legacy of the subjects post mortality.

Meteorite castings 

Between 2008 and 2017 de Cadenet made a small series of castings in certified extra-terrestrial meteorite metal he purchased in Tucson, Arizona. The meteorite works include works that have overt religious symbolism including, The Origin, Hunger and Creation a series of different apples with one, two and three bites taken from them.

A meteorite apple was sold at Philips Auctioneers in 2016 setting a record price for the artist's sculptures at auction. In 2017, he produced Meteorite Egg which is considered the largest casting made of meteorite metal ever made.

Life Burgers
In 2016, the artist launched his Life Burger sculptures in California which continued his preoccupation with human ambition, material success and mortality. The works received wide critical acclaim. In 2018, the Sunday Times reported the sale of the unique, 7 inch high, solid silver Trump Burger for £30,000 to a UK collector.

Awakened Artists
Following his meeting with spiritual teacher Eckhart Tolle in 2016, the artist founded the Awakened Artists group of artists which is an international community of artists whose work explores themes around evolving consciousness. In 2017 Awakened Artists co-produced Art Awakens Humanity, a conference at St Stephen Walbrook in the City of London, exploring the relationship between art and spirituality. His interviews with various artists and spiritual teachers have been published in Watkins Magazine, including David Lynch, Eckhart Tolle on Art and the Spiritual Dimension and Eckhart Tolle's Photos of Nature and Alex and Allyson Grey.

Editorial / Curatorial Projects / Poetry 
He has had two books of poetry published, The Muse in 1999 and Afterbirth in 2015. Both publications explore his experience of the darker side of the female psyche.

In 2016, Unicorn Publishing published Alexander de Cadenet a retrospective of the artists work by art-historian Edward Lucie-Smith.

References

External links

www.alexanderdecadenet.com
https://www.awakenedartists.com

1974 births
Living people
English artists
People from Chelsea, London
People educated at Harrow School
English television presenters
English people of French descent